Rodrigo Ābols (born 5 January 1996) is a Latvian professional ice hockey forward for Örebro HK of the Swedish Hockey League (SHL). Ābols was selected in the seventh round, 184th overall, by the Vancouver Canucks during the 2016 NHL Entry Draft.

He is the son of Artis Ābols, who also played ice hockey and is currently the head coach of Dinamo Riga of the Kontinental Hockey League.

Playing career
During the 2014–15 season, Ābols skated for both Dinamo Riga of the Kontinental Hockey League (KHL) and HK Rīga of the Minor Hockey League (MHL). He made his KHL debut on 27 December 2014 with Riga, whom his father, Artis Ābols, coached.

Ābols joined the Portland Winterhawks of the Western Hockey League (WHL) for the 2015–16 season. In 62 games, Ābols registered 20 goals and 49 points. During the 2016 NHL Entry Draft, Ābols was selected in the seventh round, 184th overall, by the Vancouver Canucks. Ābols split the 2016–17 season between the Winterhawks and the Acadie–Bathurst Titan of the Quebec Major Junior Hockey League.

Ābols skated for Örebro HK of the Swedish Hockey League (SHL) during the 2017–18 season. While on loan, he also played for BIK Karlskoga of HockeyAllsvenskan. With his rights expired from the Canucks, he continued his tenure with Örebro HK in the 2018–19 season, increasing his production with 18 goals and 26 points in 45 games.

On 28 May 2019, the Florida Panthers signed Ābols to a two-year, entry-level contract.

Approaching his second season under contract with the Panthers, on 3 August 2020, Ābols returned to Sweden to begin the 2020–21 season on loan with his former club, Örebro HK. He returned to the SHL with the North American season delayed until mid-November due to the COVID-19 pandemic. On 13 January 2021, Ābols was released by the Florida Panthers.

International play
Ābols participated at the 2013 World Junior Ice Hockey Championships as a member of the Latvian national junior team. He made his senior international debut in Prague at the 2015 IIHF World Championships.

Career statistics

Regular season and playoffs

International

References

External links

1996 births
Acadie–Bathurst Titan players
BIK Karlskoga players
Dinamo Riga players
Greenville Swamp Rabbits players
Latvian ice hockey forwards
Living people
Örebro HK players
Portland Winterhawks players
HK Riga players
Ice hockey people from Riga
Springfield Thunderbirds players
Vancouver Canucks draft picks
Ice hockey players at the 2022 Winter Olympics
Olympic ice hockey players of Latvia